Climate change in India is having profound effects on India, which is ranked fourth among the list of countries most affected by climate change in 2015. India emits about 3 gigatonnes (Gt) CO2eq of greenhouse gases each year; about two and a half tons per person, which is less than the world average. The country emits 7% of global emissions, despite having 17% of the world population. Temperature rises on the Tibetan Plateau are causing Himalayan glaciers to retreat, threatening the flow rate of the Ganges, Brahmaputra, Yamuna and other major rivers. A 2007 World Wide Fund for Nature (WWF) report states that the Indus River may run dry for the same reason. Heat waves' frequency and intensity are increasing in India because of climate change. Severe landslides and floods are projected to become increasingly common in such states as Assam. Climate change performance index of India ranks eighth among 63 countries which account for 92% of all GHG emissions in the year 2021.

According to some current projections, the number and severity of droughts in India will have markedly increased by the end of the present century.

Greenhouse gas emissions 

Greenhouse gas emissions by India are the third largest in the world and the main source is coal. India emits about 3 gigatonnes (Gt) CO2eq of greenhouse gases each year; about two tons per person, which is half the world average. The country emits 7% of global emissions.

 these figures are quite uncertain, but a comprehensive greenhouse gas inventory is within reach. Cutting greenhouse gas emissions, and therefore air pollution in India, would have health benefits worth 4 to 5 times the cost, which would be the most cost-effective in the world.

The Paris Agreement commitments included a reduction of this intensity by 33–35% by 2030.  India's annual emissions per person are less than the global average, and the UNEP forecasts that by 2030 they will be between 3 and 4 tonnes.

In 2019 China is estimated to have emitted 27% of world GhG, followed by the US with 11%, then India with 6.6%.

The Indian national carbon trading scheme may be created in 2023.

Electricity generation 
As of September 2021 India generates 39.8% of its electricity from renewable energy sources and 60.2% of its electricity from fossil fuels of which 51% is generated from coal.

Coal fired power stations 
As well as coal mining in India, the country also imports coal to burn in coal-fired power stations in India. New plants are unlikely to be built, old and dirty plants may be shut down and more coal may be burnt in the remaining plants.

Household fuel 
Switching from traditional fuels to liquefied petroleum gas and electricity provides health and climate benefits.

Industry 
A quarter of emissions are industrial mainly from producing cement, iron and steel. Industrial sector fuel consumption increased by 406% between 2000 and 2014.

As of 2014, 42% of energy was also consumed by industry.

Agriculture 
Agricultural emissions increased 25% between 2005 and 2014, in part due to significant increases in the use of artificial fertilizers and the burning of crops.

Waste 
Waste emitted 78 Mt of CO2eq in 2014.

Impacts on the natural environment

Temperature and weather changes 

In May 2022 severe heatwave was recorded in Pakistan and India. The temperature reached 51 °C. Climate change makes such heatwaves 100 times more likely. Without climate change heatwaves, more severe that those who occurred in 2010 are expected to arrive 1 time in 312 years. Now they are expected to occur every 3 years.

A 2018 study projects droughts to increase in Northern and North-western India in the near future. Around the end of the century, most parts of India will likely face more and more severe droughts.

Severe landslides and floods are projected to become increasingly common in such states as Assam.

Sea level rise 

Meghalaya and other northeastern states are concerned that rising sea levels will submerge much of Bangladesh and spawn a refugee crisis. If severe climate changes occurs, Bangladesh and parts of India that border it may lose vast tracts of coastal land.

Thousands of people have been displaced by ongoing sea level rises that have submerged low-lying islands in the Sundarbans.

Water resources 

Temperature rises on the Tibetan Plateau are causing Himalayan glaciers to retreat, threatening the flow rate of the Ganga, Brahmaputra, Yamuna, and other major rivers; the livelihoods of hundreds of thousands of farmers depend on these rivers. A 2007 World Wide Fund for Nature (WWF) report states that the Indus River may run dry for the same reason.

Ecosystems 
Ecological disasters, such as a 1998 coral bleaching event that killed off more than 70% of corals in the reef ecosystems off Lakshadweep and the Andamans and was brought on by elevated ocean temperatures tied to global warming, are also projected to become increasingly common.

Impacts on people

Economic impacts 
India has the world's highest social cost of carbon. A report by the London-based global think tank Overseas Development Institute found that India may lose anywhere around 3–10% of its GDP annually by 2100 and its poverty rate may rise by 3.5% in 2040 due to climate change.

Agriculture 
Climate Change in India will have a disproportionate impact on the more than 400 million that make up India's poor. This is because so many depend on natural resources for their food, shelter and income. More than 56% of people in India work in agriculture, while many others earn their living in coastal areas.

Health impacts 
Air pollution, which reflects sunlight, and irrigation, which cools the air by evaporation, have counteracted climate change since 1970. These two factors do however increase the impact of heat waves, as both lead to increased mortality.

Heat waves 

Heat waves' frequency and power are increasing in India because of climate change. In 2019, the temperature reached 50.6 degrees Celsius, 36 people were killed. The high temperatures are expected to impact 23 states in 2019, up from nine in 2015 and 19 in 2018. The number of heat wave days has increased—not just day temperature, night temperatures increased also. 2018 was the country's sixth hottest year on record, and 11 of its 15 warmest years have occurred since 2004. The capital New Delhi broke its all-time record with a high of 48 degrees Celsius.

In India, exposure to heat waves is said to increase by 8 times between 2021 and 2050, and by 300% by the end of this century. The number of Indians exposed to heat waves increased by 200% from 2010 to 2016. Heat waves also affect farm labour productivity. The heat waves affect central and northwestern India the most, and the eastern coast and Telangana have also been affected. In 2015, the latter places witnessed at least 2500 deaths. In 2016, for the first time in history, Kerala reported a heat wave. The government is being advised by the Indian Institute of Tropical Meteorology in predicting and mitigating heat waves. The government of Andhra Pradesh, for instance, is creating a Heat Wave Action Plan.

The death toll from India's heat waves has decreased in the last four years. More than 2,000 people died in 2015, 375 in 2017 and 20 in 2018. "Officials say this is because the government has made an effort to reduce the death toll by encouraging residents to reduce or alter the time spent working on hot days and by providing free drinking water to hard-hit populations". It also used water to cool streets and forced police to guard water tankers in Madhya Pradesh state after fights oversupply turned deadly. Those measures cost a lot of money and water, and the government's resources were limited in 2019 by the country's national election. The heat wave may continue, as monsoon rains have been delayed this year.

Impacts on migration 
Around seven million people are projected to be displaced due to, among other factors, submersion of parts of Mumbai and Chennai, if global temperatures were to rise by 2 °C (3.6 °F).

Villagers in India's North Eastern state of Meghalaya are also concerned that rising sea levels will submerge neighboring low-lying Bangladesh, resulting in an influx of refugees into Meghalaya which has few resources to handle such a situation.

Mitigation

Greenhouse gas sinks 
Land use, land-use change, and forestry absorbed 300 Mt of CO2eq in 2014 and in 2020 total carbon stored in forests was 7000 Mt.

Energy policy 

The National Energy Plan is in accord with the Paris Agreement target of 2 °C global warming, but if India stopped building coal-fired power stations it would meet the 1.5 °C aspiration. India pledged to achieve electric power generation of 40% percent non-fossil fuel energy by 2030.

In its Biennial Update Report to the United Nations Framework Convention on Climate Change (UNFCCC) submitted in February, India said it has progressively continued decoupling of economic growth from greenhouse gas emissions. India's emission intensity of gross domestic product (GDP) has reduced by 24% between 2005 and 2016. India is therefore on track to meet its voluntary declaration to reduce the emission intensity of GDP by 20–25% from 2005 levels by 2020, making India the only G20 nation to meet climate goals.

India's Intended Nationally Determined Contribution includes reducing emission intensity by a third by 2030. India has adequate carbon neutral resources such as biomass, wind, solar, hydro power, etc. to achieve net zero carbon emissions.

With accelerated coal plant closures, and an anticipated surge in renewables, thermal power will account for only an estimated 42.7% of installed capacity across India by 2027, down dramatically from 66.8% in 2017.

Cutting greenhouse gas emissions, and therefore air pollution in India, would have health benefits worth 4 to 5 times the cost, which would be the most cost-effective in the world.

India has made significant strides in the energy sector and the country is now a global leader in renewable energy.

Policies and legislation 
The Indian Government as well as various state governments have taken certain steps in accordance with India's energy policy and the Paris Agreement. Following are some of those steps:

 Doubling India's renewable energy target to 450 gigawatt (GW) by 2030 
 National Solar Mission
 Wind power in India

In 2008, India published its National Action Plan on Climate Change (NAPCC), which contains several goals for the country. These goals include but are not limited to: covering one third of the country with forests and trees, increasing renewable energy supply to 6% of total energy mix by 2022, and the further maintenance of disaster management. All of the actions work to improve the resiliency of the country as a whole, and this proves to be important because India has an economy closely tied to its natural resource base and climate-sensitive sectors such as agriculture, water, and forestry.

While presenting the fiscal year 2020-2021 state budget for the Indian state of Odisha, Finance Minister of the state Niranjan Pujari introduced the Climate Budget. Climate budget aims to keep track of the expenses made by the government for climate change or to support mitigation and adaption actions to address climate change. As per the document, It will help the government to decide whether to redesign or safeguard the existing projects by seeing their impact on the climate change. Odisha has become the first state in India to introduce climate budget.

Niti Aayog is in the process of devising a policy framework and its deployment mechanism in India for carbon capture and utilization or storage (CCUS) to reduce greenhouse emissions per unit of economic activity.

Carbon trading
Carbon trading is yet to be implemented in India. However, related instruments such as energy saving certificates (PAT), various renewable purchase obligations (RPO), and renewable energy certificates (REC) are traded on the power exchanges regularly.

International cooperation 

As a party to the Paris Agreement India is due to submit its first biennial transparency report to the UNFCCC by 2024 and inventory figures in standard format. In September 2021 India announced that it will submit a new Nationally Determined Contribution before COP26. At COP26, India set the latest target date planning to be net-zero by 2070. This was the first time in that a date for carbon neutrality has been given as part of India's climate policy.

At COP26 Indian prime minister Narendra Modi announced 5 main commitments called Panchamrit - "India's gift to the world":

 Reaching carbon neutrality by 2070.
 Expand the energy capacity not coming from fossil fuels to 500GW by 2030.
 Cut the carbon intensity of economy by 45% by 2030.
 Draw half of its energy requirement from renewable sources by 2030.
 Cut 1 billion tons of GHG emission from the amount projected to the year 2030.

The prime minister also proposed to advance a new agenda: LIFE - Lifestyle for Environment, meaning changing lifestyle for benefit the environment.

Even though the date of net zero is far behind that of China and the US and India's government wants to continue with the use of coal, Indian environmentalists and economists applauded the decision, describing it as a bold climate action.

Adaptation
An Ice Stupa designed by Sonam Wangchuk brings glacial water to farmers in the Himalayan Desert of Ladakh, India.

A research project conducted between 2014 and 2018 in the five districts (Puri, Khordha, Jagatsinghpur, Kendrapara and Bhadrak) of Mahanadi Delta, Odisha and two districts (North and South 24 Parganas) of Indian Bengal Delta (includes the Indian Sundarbans), West Bengal provides evidence on the kinds of adaptations practiced by the delta dwellers. In the Mahanadi delta, the top three practiced adaptations were changing the amount of fertiliser used in the farm, the use of loans, and planting of trees around the homes. In the Indian Bengal Delta, the top three adaptations were changing the amount of fertiliser used in the farm, making changes to irrigation practices, and use of loans. Migration as an adaptation option is practiced in both these deltas but is not considered as a successful adaptation.

In the Indian Sundarbans of West Bengal, farmers are cultivating salt-tolerant rice varieties which have been revived to combat the increasing issue of soil salinity. Other agricultural adaptations include mixed farming, diversifying crops, rain water harvesting, drip irrigation, use of neem-based pesticide, and ridge and farrow land shaping techniques where "the furrows help with drainage and the less-saline ridges can be used to grow vegetables". These have helped farmers to grow a second crop of vegetables besides the monsoon paddy crop.

In Puri district of Odisha, water logging is a hazard that affects people yearly. In the Totashi village, many women are turning the "water logging in their fields to their advantage" by cultivating vegetables in the waterlogged fields and boosting their family income and nutrition.
Education
Education is an integral tool that can be used in the adaptation of the measures that have been put in place to curb climate change. When considering the adaptation of measures that have been established to curb climate change, it is important to ensure that the education system has been included in such a project.₳ By improving people's knowledge of climate change, it would be easier for them to adopt different mitigation measures. Also, there is a need to instill a culture among the younger generation on the best practices when it comes to environmental matters. The government must seek to ensure that systems that support learning, which undergirds adaptation are supported to enhance adaptation.

Society and culture

Media coverage 

A qualitative analysis of some mainstream Indian newspapers (particularly opinion and editorial pieces) during the release of the IPCC 4th Assessment Report and during the Nobel Peace Prize win by Al Gore and the IPCC found that Indian media strongly pursue the frame of scientific certainty in their coverage of climate change. This is in contrast to the skepticism displayed by American newspapers at the time. Alongside, Indian media highlight frames of energy challenge, social progress, public accountability and looming disaster. This sort of coverage finds parallels in European media narratives as well and helps build a transnational, globalized discourse on climate change. Another study has found that the media in India are divided along the lines of a north–south, risk-responsibility discourse.

Activism 

Calculations in 2021 showed that, for giving the world a 50% chance of avoiding a temperature rise of 2 degrees or more India should increase its climate commitments by 55%. For a 95% chance it should increase the commitments by 147%. For giving a 50% chance of staying below 1.5 degrees India should increase its commitments by 191%.

There have been school strikes for climate organised by activists such as Disha Ravi.

Tribal people in India's remote northeast planned to honor former U.S. Vice President Al Gore in 2007 with an award for promoting awareness on climate change that they say will have a devastating impact on their homeland.

Meghalaya- meaning 'Abode of the Clouds' in Hindi—is home to the towns of Cherrapunji and Mawsynram, which are credited with being the wettest places in the world due to their high rainfall. But scientists state that global climate change is causing these areas to experience an increasingly sparse and erratic rainfall pattern and a lengthened dry season, affecting the livelihoods of thousands of villagers who cultivate paddy and maize. Some areas are also facing water shortages.

People are becoming aware of the ills of global warming. Taking initiative on their own people from Sangamner, Maharashtra (near Shirdi) have started a campaign of planting trees known as Dandakaranya- The Green Movement. It was started by visionary & ace freedom fighter the late Shri Bhausaheb Thorat in 2005. To date, they have sowed more than 12 million seeds & planted half a million plants.

See also 

Climate change adaptation
Climate change mitigation
Climate finance
Plug-in electric vehicles in India
Climate change in South Asia

References

Bibliography

Further reading
 Malone, David M., C. Raja Mohan, and Srinath Raghavan, eds. The Oxford handbook of Indian foreign policy (2015) excerpt pp 663–680.

External links 
 India GHG Program: Industry-led voluntary framework to measure and manage greenhouse gas emissions
 GHG Platform: Civil Society Initiative to Understand India's GHG Emission Estimates
 Electricity Map: Live carbon emissions from electricity generation in some states
 Climate Explorer

India
Climate change in India